Joshua Miles (born January 4, 1996) is an American football offensive tackle for the Arizona Cardinals of the National Football League (NFL). He played college football at Morgan State.

Professional career

Miles was drafted by the Arizona Cardinals with the 248th overall pick in the seventh round of the 2019 NFL Draft.

On September 25, 2021, Miles was placed on injured reserve. He was activated on October 16.

On August 30, 2022, Miles was waived/injured by the Cardinals and placed on injured reserve.

References

External links
Arizona Cardinals bio
Morgan State Bears bio

1996 births
Living people
Players of American football from Baltimore
American football offensive tackles
Morgan State Bears football players
Arizona Cardinals players